Dedi Mulyadi (born 11 April 1971) is an Indonesian politician who was the regent of Purwakarta, holding that position between 2008 and 2018.

Biography
Dedi Mulyadi was born in Sukasari, Subang on 11 April 1971 as the youngest of nine siblings. His father, Sahlin Ahmad Suryana, was a member of the Indonesian National Armed Forces (TNI) and his mother, Kasiti, an Indonesian Red Cross activist.

Mulyadi is married to Anne Ratna Mustika (former Miss Purwakarta). They have 3 children: Maulana Akbar Ahmad Habibie, Yudistira Manunggaling Rahmaning Hurip, and Nyi Hyang Sukma Ayu.

Education
Mulyadi finished elementary school at SD Subakti in 1984, junior high at SMP Kalijati in 1987 and senior high at SMA Negeri Purwadadi in 1990, all three located in Subang. Afterwards, he moved to Purwakarta to study law at Purnawarman law school until graduating in 1999.

Political career
In 1999, Mulyadi began his political career as member of Purwakarta's house of representatives for Golkar and the electoral district Tegalwaru. He subsequently was vice-secretary and secretary until he became leader of Golkar's local chapter in 2004. At the age of 32, Mulyadi became the youngest vice-regent, serving under Lily Hambali Hasan's regency over Purwakarta from 2003 to 2008. In turn, he was elected as the next regent of Purwakarta in 2008 and again for a second term in 2013. Mulyadi succeeded Irianto MS Syafiuddin as leader of Golkar in its West Java branch in 2016.

He ran as running mate to Deddy Mizwar in the 2018 gubernatorial election for West Java, but the pair lost. His term as regent expired on 13 March 2018.

Mulyadi ran as a candidate to the People's Representative Council for the 2019 legislative election representing West Java's 7th electoral district under Golkar and secured a seat. Mulyadi also became the head of the West Java campaign team for Joko Widodo in the 2019 Indonesian presidential election. Mulyadi later called for Jakarta's reintegration with West Java following plans to move the capital away from Jakarta, citing historical associations and integrated transport networks.

FPI opposition 
In 2015–2016,Islamic Defenders Front (FPI) launched several hate crimes, raids and attack against the Dedi Mulyadi administration in Purwakarta. FPI accused the Mulyadi of being a musyrik (polytheist) after he put up statues of Sundanese puppet characters in a number of parks throughout Purwakarta. The FPI also has accused Dedi of debasing Islamic tenets by using the Sundanese greeting sampurasun, instead of the more Islamic as-salamu alaykum. In December 2015, around a hundred FPI members inspected cars passing through the front gate of Taman Ismail Marzuki (TIM) in Central Jakarta where the Indonesia Theater Federation Award was being held, trying to stop Mulyadi from attending the event.

References 

1971 births
Sundanese people
Living people
Mayors and regents of places in West Java
Members of Indonesian regency councils
Golkar politicians
Regents of places in Indonesia